Kim Da-hyun (born Kim Se-hyun on January 1, 1980) is a South Korean actor and singer. Kim made his entertainment debut in 1999 as the lead vocalist of the rock band Yada (which disbanded in 2004). Since then, he has been actively engaged in the musical theatre scene, playing lead roles in The Sorrows of Young Werther, Hedwig and the Angry Inch and La Cage aux Folles.

Theater

Filmography

Television series

Film

Discography

Awards and nominations

References

External links

 
 
 

1980 births
Living people
South Korean male musical theatre actors
South Korean male stage actors
South Korean male television actors
South Korean male film actors